Kwong Yuen Estate is a public housing estate and Tenants Purchase Scheme estate in Siu Lek Yuen, Sha Tin, Hong Kong. Unlike other public estates in Sha Tin, Kwong Yuen Estate is built on sloping platform, instead of reclaimed land. In 2001, some of the flats were sold to the tenants through Tenants Purchase Scheme Phase 4.

Kwong Lam Court and Hong Lam Court are the Home Ownership Scheme courts within Kwong Yuen Estate. They have three blocks each, and were both completed in 1990.

History
The estate was built as part of the development of Sha Tin New Town. Unlike most of the new town, the estate site was not reclaimed from Tide Cove, as it is located on a hillside. The site was used for agriculture until the early 1980s. It was cleared and re-graded in 1984 and 1985.

Kwong Yuen Estate was the eleventh public housing estate in Sha Tin, and was developed in phases. The contract to construct the first phase, valued at HK$205.67 million, was signed on 24 February 1986. The contract covered the construction of four 35-storey "Trident" residential blocks, a primary school, a community hall, and roads.

Kwong Yuen Community Hall, operated by the Sha Tin District Office, opened to the public on 15 January 1990.

Demographics
According to the 2011 census, Kwong Yuen Estate has a population of 13,908. Kwong Lam Court and Hong Lam Court house 5,272 and 3,062 respectively. Altogether the population amounts to 22,242.

According to 2016 Population By-census, Kwong Yuen Estate has a population of 12,835. Kwong Lam Court and Hong Lam Court house 5,285 and 3,135 respectively. Altogether the population amounts to 21,255.

Houses

Kwong Yuen Estate

Kwong Lam Court

Hong Lam Court 
Hong Lam Court is adjacent to two government quarters, Yee King House and Hoi Wan House, which were developed at the same time as Hong Lam Court by the Hong Kong Housing Authority but are not included in the below table.

Commercial complex

The design of the commercial complex of the estate was designed to blend into the village environment in the vicinity. Unlike the commercial centres of other public housing estates, the complex consists of five two-level blocks which are standing on two platforms. The complex slopes from the east to the west to a difference of 15 m. A 26 m clock tower reinforces the image of the commercial complex.

In 1992, the design of the commercial complex won a Certificate of Merit in the annual design competition organised by the Hong Kong Institute of Architects.

See also
 List of public housing estates in Hong Kong
 Public housing in Hong Kong

References

External links

1989 establishments in Hong Kong
Public housing estates in Hong Kong
Residential buildings completed in 1989
Siu Lek Yuen
Tenants Purchase Scheme